Didier Migaud (born 6 June 1952) was president of the French Court of Audit from 2010 to 2020, and member of the National Assembly of France from 1988 to 2010.

Migaud represented Isère's 4th constituency in the National Assembly of France from 1988 to 2010 as a member of the New Left group.

In February 2010, he was nominated as the Chief Baron (premier président) of the Court of Audit which was left vacant after the death of Philippe Séguin.

Anecdotes
On October 7, 2010, Didier Migaud answered "76" to the question; "how much is 7 times 9?" , posed by a journalist of BFM TV, before beginning again to give the correct answer.

References

1952 births
Living people
Politicians from Tours, France
Politicians from Centre-Val de Loire
Socialist Party (France) politicians
Deputies of the 9th National Assembly of the French Fifth Republic
Deputies of the 10th National Assembly of the French Fifth Republic
Deputies of the 11th National Assembly of the French Fifth Republic
Deputies of the 12th National Assembly of the French Fifth Republic
Deputies of the 13th National Assembly of the French Fifth Republic
Commandeurs of the Légion d'honneur